İçli Pide (Turkish: İçli Pide) is a savory dish of Middle Eastern origin consisting of a usually round, flattened base of leavened wheat-based dough topped with tomatoes, cheese, and often various other ingredients (such as  meat, kaşar, beyaz peynir etc.), which is then baked at a high temperature, traditionally in a wood-fired oven. A person who makes pide is known as a pideci.

Variations
Pide with peynir (Peynirli pide)
Pide with beef (Etli pide)
Pide with kaşar (Kaşarlı pide)
Pide with sucuk (Sucuklu pide)
Pide with pastırma (Pastırmalı pide)
Pide with peynir and egg (Peynirli yumurtalı pide)
Pide with beef and egg (Etli yumurtalı pide)
Pide with kaşar and egg (Kaşarlı yumurtalı pide)
Pide with sucuk and egg (Sucuklu yumurtalı pide)
Pide with pastırma and egg (Pastırmalı yumurtalı pide)
Pide with tahin (Tahinli pide)
Pide with garlic (Sarımsaklı pide)

Regional Pide Styles
Karadeniz pidesi
Kır pidesi
Güveç pide
Cıvıklı
Tahinli pide
Bursa cantık pide
Etliekmek
Lahmacun 
Fındık lahmacun
Nazilli pidesi
Karacasu pidesi

See also
Bursa cantık pide
 Khachapuri
 Etli ekmek
 Pastrmajlija

References

Turkish cuisine
Savoury pies